The 2021 LIU Sharks football team represented both the LIU Post and LIU Brooklyn campuses of Long Island University as a member of the Northeast Conference (NEC) in the 2021 NCAA Division I FCS football season. The Sharks, led by interim head coach Jonathan Gill, played their home games at Bethpage Federal Credit Union Stadium.

Schedule

References

Wagner
LIU Sharks football seasons
LIU Sharks football